Conflict & Catalysis: Productions & Arrangements 1966-2006 is a compilation album by Welsh musician John Cale released by Big Beat Records in February 2012. It features twenty songs from Cale-produced albums by other artists. It includes tracks from all decades in which he worked as a producer: the sixties (The Stooges), the seventies (Patti Smith), eighties (Happy Mondays), nineties (Siouxsie and the Banshees) and the new millennium (Alejandro Escovedo). The last song is "Spinning Away" from Cale's collaborative album with Brian Eno Wrong Way Up (1990).

Track listing

References

John Cale compilation albums
2012 compilation albums
Albums produced by John Cale